European Film Promotion (EFP) is an international promotion organisation and a unique network of 38 national film promotion institutes who represent films and talent from their respective territories. Under the EFP flag, the members team up on initiatives to promote the diversity and the spirit of European cinema and talent at key international film festivals and markets.

Activities
EFP's joint promotional strategies including artistic and business-oriented platforms with a focus on three main areas: Promotion of Films & Talent, Access to International Markets, and Film Sales Support outside of Europe.

EFP has developed innovative programmes and initiatives such as the well-known programmes European Shooting Stars, introducing young talented actors to the press, industry and public at the Berlin International Film Festival, and Producers on the Move, a networking event at the Cannes Film Festival to promote and link up aspiring young producers. Further programmes concentrate on films by female directors (Europe! Voices of Women in Film at Sidney Film Festival) and young talented directors (Future Frames at the Karlovy Vary International Film Festival) or focus on outstanding documentary productions from Europe (The Changing Face of Europe at the Hot Docs Canadian International Documentary Festival, Toronto).

EFP organises and operates Europe! Umbrellas to establish a joint European presence and visibility in key international markets outside of Europe, and it also backs marketing campaigns for European films to countries outside of Europe via Film Sales Support.

National Film Promotion Institutes
The following 38 organisations from 37 European countries are members of EFP:

History
Its predecessor was the European distribution organisation European Film Distribution Office (EFDO) which had been established by Dieter Kosslick and others in Hamburg in 1988 as a pilot project of the European MEDIA I funding programme. The concept of a network was taken up and further developed by the initial ten members of the European Film Promotion association when it was founded in 1997. The network's President is Martin Martin Schweighofer (Austrian Film Commission) and Sonja Heinen took over the responsibility for its management from her predecessor and EFP co-founder Renate Rose in 2017.

Partners
EFP is financially supported by the Creative Europe – MEDIA Programme of the European Union and by its member organisations. The Hamburg-based office is backed by the German Federal Government Commissioner for Culture and the Media, the Film Fund Hamburg Schleswig-Holstein, and the Ministry of Culture of the City of Hamburg.

References

External links
 www.efp-online.com Official Website

Film organisations in Germany